The thoracic spinal nerve 5 (T5) is a spinal nerve of the thoracic segment.

It originates from the spinal column from below the thoracic vertebra 5 (T5).

References

Spinal nerves